War of the Robots (Italian title: La guerra dei robot) is a 1978 Italian science fiction film directed by Alfonso Brescia. It was released internationally as Reactor.

Cast 
Antonio Sabato as Captain John Boyd
Yanti Somer as Julie
Malisa Longo as Lois
Giacomo Rossi Stuart as Roger
Aldo Canti as Kuba the Alien
Licinia Lentini as Commander King's assistant
Venantino Venantini as Paul
Jacques Herlin as Professor Carr
Ines Pellegrini as Sonia

Reception

Fantastic Musings found the movie bad. , Salon noted that it was part of a series of B-movie Star Wars rip offs from director Brescia.

References

External links 

1978 films
Films directed by Alfonso Brescia
1970s science fiction action films
1970s adventure films
1970s Italian-language films
Italian science fiction action films
Robot films
Italian action adventure films
Films scored by Marcello Giombini
1970s Italian films